Shaykh Hassan Cisse (1945-2008) was the preeminent spokesmen of the Tariqa Tijaniyya in recent times. He was an accomplished Islamic scholar, emerging from a long and vibrant legacy of Islamic learning in West Africa. The grandson and spiritual heir of Shaykh Ibrahim Niasse, he was designated by Shaykh Ibrahim as Imam of the Jama’at Nasr al-Ilm (“Community of Helping Knowledge”), the followers of Shaykh Ibrahim who are historically the largest single Muslim movement in twentieth-century West Africa.

Shaykh Hassan was a consummate scholar and spiritual guide. He received a complete training in the traditional Islamic sciences: the Qur’an and its exegesis (tafsir), Prophetic traditions (hadith) and history (seerah), jurisprudence and its sources (fiqh and usul), literature (adab), poetry (shi’r), grammar (nahw), and Sufism (tasawwuf). After memorizing the Qur’an at a young age in Mauritania, he was educated mostly in Senegal under the personal supervision of Shaykh Ibrahim Niasse, who had gathered in Kaolack, Senegal, some of the most renowned scholars from Senegal, Mauritania, Nigeria, and beyond. These included Shaykh Hassan’s own father, Sidi Ali Cisse, and his mother, Sayyida Fatima Zahra Niasse. The Cisse lineage, originally Mande speakers, is one of the most ancient scholarly groups in West Africa, tracing its conversion to Islam back 1000 years to Kumbe Saleh, one of the great cities of West Africa’s proud history. In many places in West Africa, “Cisse” used to be simply synonymous with “scholar.”

Education 

Besides the “traditional” sciences, Shaykh Hassan also attained high merit in later academic education, completing a B.A. in Islamic Studies and Arabic Literature from Ain Shams University (Cairo, Egypt) and an M.A. in English from the University of London. Near completion of his PhD in Islamic Studies at Northwestern University (Chicago, IL), his father passed, and Shaykh Hassan was obliged to return to Senegal to assume the imamate in Kaolack. Shaykh Hassan is fluent in Arabic, English, French, Hausa and his native Wolof language.

Life and Achievements 
Although Shaykh Hassan was only thirty at the time of his grandfather’s passing, Shaykh Ibrahim was said to show him special favor from the time of his birth in 1945. In Shaykh Ibrahim’s last will and testament, he recommended his own children to his closest disciple and lifelong companion, Sidi Ali Cisse, and said that they should “be with him as they are with me now.” The will mentions Shaykh Hassan by name as the community’s Imam after his father. Shaykh Hassan was the last to see Shaykh Ibrahim alive.

Shaykh Hassan Cisse continued the work of his grandfather, introducing Islam to thousands and unifying diverse cultures under the banner of Islam. The Shaykh positively affected the lives of many in societies rife with ethnic and religious tensions, such as Nigeria, Mauritania, South Africa and the United States. Shaykh Hassan first came to America in 1976, and since worked tirelessly to promote good-will and positive exchange between Americans and the international Muslim community, emphasizing the essential spirituality and etiquette (Sufism) of Islam to promote individual betterment and real brotherhood. These efforts bore fruit through the founding of the African American Islamic Institute (www.aaii.info), a UN recognized non-governmental organization (NGO) which promotes education, health care, women’s rights, and international exchange and dialogue between America and West Africa.

Shaykh Hassan’s social efforts were recognized by several international organizations, such as the World Health Organization (WHO), the United Nations Population Fund (UNPFA), the United Nations Children’s Fund (UNICEF) and Rotary International. He frequently participated in the United Nations annual conference for the world-wide NGO community. He participated in annual United Nations conferences for NGOs and was a frequently invited guest speaker at UNICEF and other UN-sponsored events. His role as an eminent Islamic scholar committed to the real needs of humanity also occasioned his election as President of the recently formed Network of African Islamic Organizations for Population and Development.

His credentials as an Islamic scholar made him a frequently invited teacher in places such as Nigeria, Mauritania, Morocco, Ghana, Niger, Burkina Faso, Ivory Coast, South Africa, France, Germany, England, the United States and beyond. The famous Azhar University in Egypt honored the Shaykh with an award of “highest distinction” for his activities as a world-renowned Muslim scholar.

Shaykh Hassan passed from this world on August 14, 2008. His funeral in Medina-Baye, Kaolack, was attended by over two million people and his departure was mourned by many more around the world. He has been succeeded by his brother and companion, Shaykh Tijani Cisse.

Publications 
Shaykh Hassan’s own scholarly reputation earned him the respect of Muslim ‘ulama around the world. For example, Shaykh Yasin al-Fadani (d. 1990), the Indonesian musnid of the Hijaz, sent him a personal diploma (ijaza) transmitting the some 700 diplomas Shaykh Yasin had collected from prominent scholars throughout the Islamic world. Similarly, the great Hadith scholar of Medina, Shaykh Ahmad Muhammad Abd al-Jawwad, presented him with an ijaza after being instructed to do so in a visionary encounter with the Prophet Muhammad. Shaykh Hassan Cisse himself possessed more than 600 ijazas from Muslim scholar all around the world, the most cherished of which remains that from his grandfather, Shaykh Ibrahim Niasse.

Some of his publications include the following:

“Shaykh Ibrahim Niasse”, Introduction to Pearls from the Divine Flood: Selected Discourses from Shaykh al-Islam Ibrahim Niasse (African American Islamic Institute, 2006).
“Khutbat al-Kitab”, Introduction to Shaykh Ibrahim Niasse: Kashif al-Ilbas. Cairo: Sharikat al-Dawliyya, 2001.
Sincere Advice. New York: MIJ Publishing, 2000.
Spirit of Good Morals of Shaykh Ibrahim Niasse, Translation and Commentary. Detroit: African American Islamic Institute, 1998.
Shaykh Ibrahim Niasse: Revivalist of the Sunnah. Tariqa Tijaniyya of New York, 1984.

References 

Flash Tourisme, “Hassan Ali Cisse: Le Cheikh Mystique de Kaolack”, No. 10, November 2007.
Nouvel Horizon, “Cheikh Hassane Cisse, Imam de Medina Baye,” No. 522, 18 May 2006.
Black Pilgrimage to Islam, Robert Dannin, Oxford University Press: US, 2005. p. 82, 251.
African American Islam, Aminah Beverly McCloud, Routledge Press: 1994. p. 93.
On the Path of the Prophet, Zachary Wright, African American Islamic Institute, 2003.

External links 
Tijani
Earthlink
Medina Baay
Ansaroudine 
Iman Hassan
AAII
Bay Tubarham
The Faydah

1945 births
Alumni of the University of London
2008 deaths
Ain Shams University alumni
Senegalese Sufi religious leaders
Senegalese Sufis
Wolof people
People from Kaolack
Senegalese expatriates in Egypt
Senegalese expatriates in the United Kingdom
Northwestern University alumni
Senegalese expatriates in the United States
Tijaniyyah order
20th-century Muslim scholars of Islam
21st-century Muslim scholars of Islam
Malikis
Sunni Sufis